Rumors is part of the Private Snafu series of animated shorts produced by Warner Bros. during World War II. Released in 1943, the cartoon was directed by Friz Freleng.

Plot
 
Private Snafu and his buddies begin talking about a recent bombing, but the story grows more exaggerated with each passing turn. Eventually, a panic breaks out on his base that a bombing is imminent. In the end, nothing happens, but the base is quarantined and Snafu is locked up.

References
 Friedwald, Will and Jerry Beck. "The Warner Brothers Cartoons." Scarecrow Press Inc., Metuchen, N.J., 1981. .

External links

1943 films
1943 animated films
Articles containing video clips
Private Snafu
Short films directed by Friz Freleng
1940s animated short films
Films scored by Carl Stalling
Films produced by Leon Schlesinger
American black-and-white films
1943 comedy films
1940s Warner Bros. animated short films
1940s American films